William Joseph Kelly   (born 1943) is an American artist, humanist and human-rights advocate.

Education 
William Kelly was born in Buffalo, New York in 1943, and received his artistic training at the University of the Arts in Philadelphia and the National Gallery School in Melbourne, Victoria (Australia), his country of part-time residence since 1968. He is also a Fulbright Fellow for which he studied at Prahran College of Advanced Education

Artist and writer 
In addition to creating traditional prints, drawings and paintings, Kelly has organized and participated in collaborations in public art and theatre. Kelly promotes his humanist ideals in his art, for example; in response to a 1987 mass murder in Melbourne, Kelly spent five years on works for an installation titled "The Peace Project." "The Peace Project" was first exhibited in 1993 in both Melbourne and Boston, Massachusetts. It was the first visual art project to receive the Australian Violence Prevention Award. His work has been exhibited in over 20 countries with a current installation in Guernica, Spain and current traveling group exhibitions throughout Europe and also South Africa (representing Australia in the Dialogue Among Civilizations International Print Portfolio organized to coincide with the cultural activities of the 2010 FIFA World Cup).

Kelly authored an anthology, Violence to Nonviolence: Individual Perspectives, Communal Voices, that was published in 1994. His artwork has also appeared in other books, such as Cultures of Crime and Violence: The Australian Experience and "Women's Encounters with Violence''.

In 2000 Kelly founded the Archive of Humanist Art, which highlights prints and drawings of artists from all over the world that address humanist concerns.  Kelly is acknowledged for the contribution his work makes to the areas of human rights, social justice and reconciliation both nationally and internationally – with projects linked to the Basque Country, Spain; Robben Island, site of the notorious prison that once held Nelson Mandela; the Republic of Georgia and Northern Ireland.

He currently has studios in Melbourne and Bethlehem, Pennsylvania.

Kelly's artworks are reproduced in publications worldwide and are represented in over 40 public and corporate collections.

Educator 
Kelly was Dean (1975–1982) of the Victorian College of the Arts following Lenton Parr. He has delivered guest lectures at Yale Graduate School of Arts and Sciences, The New York Studio School and others in Europe, South Africa, North America, Eastern Europe, Australasia. He currently lives and works in Nathalia in regional Victoria, where in 2010 he established the G.R.A.I.N. Store (Growing Rural Art in Nathalia) , a not-for-profit rural arts centre with a regular schedule of exhibitions, performances and workshops by visiting, local and indigenous emerging and established creative artists.

Awards

For his role as an international artist, humanist, human rights advocate, and founder of the Archive of Humanist Art , Kelly received the Courage of Conscience Award  from The Peace Abbey in Sherborn, Massachusetts .

He was recipient of the Medal of the Order of Australia (OAM) (for Services to Visual Arts and Urban Design). He is Founding and Honorary Life Member of the Australian Centre for Contemporary Art, Founding Member of the Urban Design Forum, and former member of the Board of the Australian Print Workshop.

References

External links
 Archive of Humanist Art
 The Peace Abbey
 Studio International site "William Kelly – Artist as Peacemaker"
  Dictionary of Australian Artists Online entry
 Prints and Printmaking Database of Catalogues
 William Kelly's 'Markers Along the Way' at the Shepparton Art Gallery Media Release: Thursday 13 July 2006
 Screenprint poster by William Kelly
 2009 Mars Gallery Exhibition images
 Swan Hill Regional Art Gallery Exhibition History 1975 to April 1987
 record of work in National Gallery of Australia collection
 Transcript of nterview with Julie Copeland on Australian Broadcasting Commission program 'Exhibit A' 28 May 2006
 G.R.A.I.N. Nathalia

American humanists
Artists from Buffalo, New York
Living people
University of the Arts (Philadelphia) alumni
Activists from Buffalo, New York
Recipients of the Medal of the Order of Australia
1943 births
National Gallery of Victoria Art School alumni
American expatriates in Australia
Swinburne University of Technology alumni
Fulbright alumni